William Houston Craig House is a historic home located at Noblesville, Hamilton County, Indiana.  It was built in 1893, and is a large -story, brick dwelling with Romanesque Revival and Queen Anne style design elements.  It features multiple projections, porches, and a corner tower with rock faced stone details and contrasting textures and materials.

It was listed on the National Register of Historic Places in 1990.  It is located in the Conner Street Historic District.

References

Houses on the National Register of Historic Places in Indiana
Romanesque Revival architecture in Indiana
Queen Anne architecture in Indiana
Houses completed in 1893
Buildings and structures in Hamilton County, Indiana
National Register of Historic Places in Hamilton County, Indiana
Historic district contributing properties in Indiana